Herbert Phillips, or similar, may refer to:

 Herbert Philips (died 1905), British philanthropist and justice of the peace
 Sir William Herbert Phillipps (1847–1935), South Australian businessman
 Sir Herbert Phillips (diplomat) (1878–1957), British diplomat in China
 Herbert Phillips (athlete) (1883–1977), South African athlete 
 Herbie Phillips (1935–1995), American jazz trumpeter, composer, and arranger

See also
 Bert Phillips (disambiguation)